Kenneth Mark Souza (born February 1, 1955) is a former Major League Baseball pitcher.

Souza was originally drafted in the first round of the 1974 Major League Baseball Draft by the Kansas City Royals. He was taken in the 1976 Rule 5 Draft by the Minnesota Twins, and pitched two seasons in their system before being released. The A's signed him to a minor-league contract in 1979, and he made his major league debut in April of the following year. He was returned to the minors a month later, and never pitched in the majors again.

External links
, or Retrosheet
Pura Pelota

1955 births
Baseball players from California
College of San Mateo alumni
Gulf Coast Royals Academy players
Living people
Major League Baseball pitchers
Oakland Athletics players
Ogden A's players
Orlando Twins players
People from Redwood City, California
Puerto Rico Boricuas players
San Jose Bees players
San Mateo Bulldogs baseball players
Tacoma Tigers players
Tigres de Aragua players
American expatriate baseball players in Venezuela
Waterloo Royals players
West Haven A's players
American expatriate baseball players in Italy